Big Island is an island on Woodhull Lake in Herkimer County, New York.

References

Islands of New York (state)
Islands of Herkimer County, New York